Darreh Chineh (also Romanized as Darreh Chīneh; also known as Darreh Chīneh-ye Pā’īn) is a village in Susan-e Sharqi Rural District, Susan District, Izeh County, Khuzestan Province, Iran. At the 2006 census, its population was 84, in 17 families.

References 

Populated places in Izeh County